Fernando Casimiro (15 March 1931 – 3 August 2014) was a Portuguese sprinter. He competed in the men's 200 metres at the 1952 Summer Olympics.

References

1931 births
2014 deaths
Athletes (track and field) at the 1952 Summer Olympics
Portuguese male sprinters
Olympic athletes of Portugal
Place of birth missing